Fernando Bernal (born 7 May 1941) is a Cuban weightlifter. He competed in the men's super heavyweight event at the 1972 Summer Olympics.

References

1941 births
Living people
Cuban male weightlifters
Olympic weightlifters of Cuba
Weightlifters at the 1972 Summer Olympics
Place of birth missing (living people)
Pan American Games medalists in weightlifting
Pan American Games silver medalists for Cuba
Pan American Games bronze medalists for Cuba
Weightlifters at the 1971 Pan American Games
20th-century Cuban people
21st-century Cuban people